There are at least 39 named lakes and reservoirs in Little River County, Arkansas.

Lakes
	Applewhite Cut-off Lake, el.  
	Bear Lake, el.  
	Boggy Slough, el.  
	Choctaw Bayou, el.  
	Cut-off Lake, el.  
	Cut-off Lake, el.  
	Dunn Lake, el.  
	First Lake, el.  
	Grassy Lake, el.  
	Grassy Lake, el.  
	Hamilton Lake, el.  
	Hudson Lake, el.  
	Hurricane Bend Lake, el.  
	LaVoice Lake, el.  
	Mill Lake, el.  
	Muddy Lake, el.  
	Old River Lake, el.  
	Old River Lake, el.  
	Old River Lake, el.  
	Pleasant Lake, el.  
	Red Lake, el.  
	Red Lake, el.  
	Roseborough Lake, el.  
	Scott Lake, el.  
	Trailer Lake, el.  
	Trout Lake, el.  
	Young Lake, el.

Reservoirs
	Country Club Lake, el.  
	Dunbar Lake, el.  
	Haney Creek Watershed Site Two Reservoir, el.  
	Harris Lake, el.  
	M C Jones Lake Number One, el.  
	Millwood Lake, el.  
	Nacoosa Paper Retention Pond, el.  
	Pullen Lake, el.  
	Pyron Lake, el.  
	SW Arkansas W D Holding Basin, el.  
	Sivley Lake, el.  
	Two Reservoir, el.

See also

 List of lakes in Arkansas

Notes

Bodies of water of Little River County, Arkansas
Little River